Eric Hahn (born March 19, 1960) is an American serial entrepreneur and computer software programmer who founded an early e-mail-based groupware company called Collabra Software in 1992. Netscape acquired Collabra in 1995, and in 1997 Hahn became Netscape's CTO. According to SEC filings Hahn netted approximately $29 million from sales in Netscape stock.

Career
Hahn founded Proofpoint, Inc in June 2002 which became a publicly traded company in April 2012.

Hahn also co-founded Lookout Software, which was acquired by Microsoft in 2004.

Hahn received his bachelor's degree from Worcester Polytechnic Institute in 1980.

Personal life
Hahn currently lives in Palo Alto, California with his wife and two sons.

References

External links 
 

Netscape
Living people
American computer businesspeople
American technology company founders
Netscape people
American chief technology officers
Worcester Polytechnic Institute alumni
1960 births